Callionima calliomenae is a moth of the family Sphingidae.

Distribution 
It is known to inhabit Venezuela, Haiti and the Dominican Republic.

Description 
The wingspan is about 67 mm. It is immediately distinguishable from all other Callionima species by the regularly dentate outer forewing margin that is only slightly excavate below the apex and the dark yellow basal half to the hindwing upperside.

Biology 
There are probably multiple generations per year.

References

C
Moths of the Caribbean
Moths of South America
Moths described in 1870